Ninja Resurrection, known in Japan as  is a two-part original video animation directed by Yasunori Urata.

The OVA series is based on Futaro Yamada's novel Makai Tensho. Although of a similar style, Ninja Resurrection is not a sequel to the anime film Ninja Scroll, despite being marketed as one outside of Japan. It also heavily borrows and adapts elements from Ken Ishikawa's manga adaptation from 1986, and Shouko Toba's manga adaptation from 1997.

Plot 
Ninja Resurrection takes place in the Tokugawa era, at a time when Christians in Japan were being persecuted. The leader of the Shimabara Rebellion, Amakusa Shirō, hoped to resist the government forces attacking Christians like him, but is assassinated.

Soon after, Amakusa's restless spirit returns to avenge his fallen comrades and is up to Yagyū Jūbei Mitsuyoshi to put a stop to the demonic onslaught.

The Revenge of Jubei
The Revenge of Jubei begins with a narration about the Battle of Sekigahara, the final battle between the Western Army, who were loyal to Toyotomi Hideyoshi, and the Eastern Army, led by Tokugawa Ieyasu; the events that led up to the Shimabara rebellion, including the capture and execution of Konishi Yukinaga, a Christian daimyō whose beliefs forbade him from committing seppuku, and the banning of Christianity in Japan; and a dark satanic prophecy about Amakusa Shirō, which foretold that if he was prevented from becoming Christ, he would return as Satan. Along with the narration, there are Japanese paintings of these events.

The first OVA called "The Cant of Hell" shows a small band of soldiers raiding a village outside of Harano Castle, and smashing a statue of Madonna. All the villagers hide except for a little boy, who they shoot. After the soldiers leave to report the Christian rebels to the shogun, a small girl named Ocho runs to the boy's body and begs him to wake up. The boy, who is Shiro, miraculously revives and shows the approaching villagers that the bullet hit a crucifix he had. Sunlight shines through the clouds onto Shiro and he raises the crucifix and a long beam of light shoots from it up into the sky. The villagers bow down and worship Shiro, declaring him the son of God and the returned messiah and saviour, and the Madonna statue reforms by itself. Meanwhile, an evil-looking man in the bushes watches the events as they unfold and smiles. 

10 years later, during the Shimabara Rebellion, a small group of shogunate soldiers are seen marching though a thick fog outside Harono Castle. Suddenly, flaming arrows land near the troops and explode to form giant crucifixes, after which the soldiers are annihilated by a barrage of arrows. Nearby, armored Christian soldiers raise banners adorned with crucifixes and cheer for their recent victory. Meanwhile, inside a chapel that had been set up in Harono Castle, Amakusa Shiro's lieutenant, Mori Soiken, informs the people of their recent victory, stating that their victories were given to them by God as a reward for their piousness. He then states that as long as Shiro, the son of God, is with them, they will emerge victorious. Shiro then addresses his people, telling them to not hate their enemies, stating that they deserve respect and that the current conflict was inevitable. He also reminds them that both sides have died and suffered. His main desire is to end this war and not further betray the will of God. Meanwhile, at the camp of the Tokugawa Army, Matsudaira Nobutsuna, the army's general, is informed of the attack's failure and they have suffered at 500 casualties. Suddenly, a cloaked individual appears and tells Matsudaira that Christian soldiers' holy magic has protected Harono Castle and that they will not be able to penetrate the castle while they are protected. He then tells Matsudaira to leave the matter to him before disappearing. A brief narration then explains the origins of Shimabara Rebellion. Matsudaira is then shown leading another attack on Harono Castle. A nearby soldier informs Miyamoto Musashi about this. Musahi then proceeds towards the castle, while noticing a kite heading towards the castle. The extremely huge kite, tethered to someplace, floats high in the clouds above Harano castle. Jubei Yagyu and four other ninjas are standing on a narrow platform on the kite. They leap from the platform through a lightning storm and float down to the castle using capes. Using the aerial assault, Jubei and his four ninjas enter the castle and begin easily slicing the Christians in half. One ninja in particular, who has a penchant for explosives, detonates a wave of explosions throughout the castle. There is intense fighting with much bloodshed. Matsudaira Nobutsuna's army uses a battering-ram to enter the castle, and the soldiers battle their enemies.

Shiro gathers the women, children, and elderly in the chapel, which the soldiers can't enter because it is protected by a seal. He promises to protect them with the power of God. However, the four ninjas know about this seal and the four barriers that are maintaining the seal, and each one destroys a barrier. Shiro is alerted to the destruction of the seal and senses Jubei, referring to him as a "mighty power that will kill us". Jubei slices a bunch of men and then comes across two kids whom he wall-runs past. The kids then find Mori Soiken, who smiles wickedly and kills them. Jubei meets Shiro on a roof and Shiro bargains with him to spare the lives of the women and children if he commits seppuku, which Jubei accepts, but Shiro is stopped by Soiken, who shows him the decapitated heads of the two kids and tells him not to trust Jubei. Shiro goes ballistic and uses his magic to summon a lot of power into himself. He then uses the power of psychokinesis to destroy the roof and fire the tanto and shingles at Jubei. Shiro then summons a black dragon with which he attacks Jubei. Miyamoto Musashi, who has entered the castle, is easily slicing through Christian soldiers as he watches the events. Jubei tries to slice the dragon in half but it proves useless. He then flees but the dragon catches up to him, and he holds on to the snout of the dragon as it flies through buildings and into the sky. Shiro emerges from the top of the dragon's head and begins strangling Jubei. Two of the ninjas try to assist Jubei by firing harpoons at the dragon, but it breaks free, so the biggest and strongest of the ninjas tells those two to stay put. He and the ninja who likes explosives perform a tactical attack: the latter opens up a bazooka and fires it at the dragon, while the former protects himself with a folding metal suit of armor with rocket propulsion (concealed in his small shoulder pads) and attacks from a different angle, causing massive damage to the dragon. Jubei cuts off Shiro's hands and falls to the roof, but the dragon's head is still alive and sneaks up behind Jubei. Jubei holds up the children's heads and hesitates Shiro mid-attack, which he capitalizes on to throw his sword at Shiro, spearing him in the chest. The impact rips Shiro from the dragon's head and flings him into a window of the main chapel. Shiro then angrily curses Jubei for what he has done before the window breaks, causing him to fall into the chapel. 

Having survived the fall and surrounded by flames and corpses, a saddened and wounded Shiro demands to know why God has abandoned him and his people. Soiken appears behind him and tells him that God does not exist, claiming that he is nothing more than a figment created by the weak in order to give their lives hope, and that his former master, Konishi Yukinaga, believed in and fought for God, which caused his entire family to be murdered by the Tokugawa. Hearing this, Shiro angrily demands to know the purpose of his existence. Suddenly, Ocho, who is revealed to be Soiken's daughter, appears and Soiken tells Shiro that if he wishes to be reborn, then he must become one with Ocho. Casting the spell that will allow Shiro to be reborn, Makai Tensho, Soiken cuts off one of his own fingers, which then comes to life and crawls inside Ocho. While Ocho proceeds to have sex with Shiro in the burning chapel, Soiken declares that from the flesh and blood of the victims of Shimabara, Shiro will be reborn as Satan and help destroy the world.

Sometime afterwards, the decapitated heads and corpses of the victims of Shimabara are shown skewered on pikes both outside and throughout the remains of Harono Castle. Meanwhile, outside the castle, Jubei is shown to have built two small graves for the two children who Soiken killed before he and his men leave. While leaving, he walks by Miyamoto Musashi, who, after Jubei and his men leave, proceeds to laugh evilly. The closing narration reveals that, with the exception of four soldiers who had surrendered, Shiro's forces were completely annihilated. In addition, Shiro, whose decapitated head is shown on top of a cross, was found lying injured and immobile in the destroyed chapel and Mori Soiken was never again seen by mortal men.

Hell's Spawn
The second OVA is called "Hell's Spawn". It begins by showing a younger Jubei kill five samurai with ease. Jubei's father, Munenori Yagyu, scolds him for his constant murders but Jubei makes excuses. Munenori challenges Jubei to a duel; warning him that he will not hesitate just because Jubei is his son. Jubei attacks but restrains himself and only slashes Munenori's shirt. Munenori jumps into the air and tosses a kunai into Jubei's eye. As Jubei stays bleeding, his father states that he knew Jubei would not attack him and used this knowledge against Jubei. Munenori tells Jubei that he must never lose and should exploit every weakness of his opponent and that he can't rely on strength alone. Jubei tells his father that he doesn't need his father's platitudes and that he is stronger than his father ever would be. Munenori banishes Jubei from his house and lands.

There is a historical narration about the strongest swordsmen of the time and how swordsmanship became a science and evolved. The samurai's discussed are Musashi Miyamoto, Mataemon Araki, Inshun Hosowei, Botaro Tamiya, Munenori Yagyu, and Jubei Yagyu. It states that their battles are legendary but their deaths are shrouded in mystery; for example, Musashi disappeared in foggy mountains and Mataemon was poisoned by an unknown person.

Several months after the Shimabara Riot, Jubei is resting under a tree when he starts to have memories of the riot and all the bodies. An old man is riding into the Yagyu lands when he spots a boy and a girl spear-fishing. The girl keeps nagging the boy and he dunks her into the water. The old man rides on towards the Yagyu estate. The girl jumps onto Jubei and pretends to be frighten of a snake. She then confesses how much she likes Jubei. When the old man, whose name is Jushin Sagoguichi, enters the estate he is dismayed that it is in ruin and that some walls are broken down. A servant tells him that lord Jubei allowed it to get that way. Jubei and the two children arrive and it turns out that Jushin is the children's father. Inside the house, Jushin scolds his daughter for not being ladylike and scolds his son, who is his heir, for doing servant's chores. Jubei tries to calm him down with sake. Another young girl, named Ohina, enters the room bringing food. She speaks graciously to Lord Jushin and Jushin compliments her on how beautiful she has become since he last saw her. As Jushin and Jubei eat, Jushin tells them that the shogun, Yorinobu, has requested that all unmarried girls of noble birth between the ages of 15-23 should be brought to Kishu. Jubei finds the mandate strange. Onwei, Jushin's daughter, protests stating she wants to stay with Jubei. Jushin tells Jubei that the shogun is amassing a large army and gathering much food and it looks like he will increase taxes. He also tells Jubei that many strange men have been coming to the capital. Jushin also tells Jubei that many girls have gone missing. Jubei invites Jushin to watch the girls spar. In the morning, Ohina demonstrates her skills with a naginata by defeating a lot of men in a sparring match. Onwei then challenges Ohina and the two battle to a standstill. Jushin compliments them on their improvement and soon afterwards leaves with them to Kishu. Before Onwei leaves, she reminds Jubei to bathe at least once every three days and to wear clean clothes. As Jubei watches them go, he tells his servant to send a spy to watch the castle in Kishu and that he, Jubei, would be gone for five days.

Somenight later, at Shosetsu Yui's residence in Edo, Ohina is attacked and raped by a born-again Inshun Hosowei. As he slowly rapes her, he licks her breasts and plays around with her. After he is finished raping Ohina, he kills her. Mataemon Araki, who is sitting nearby, comments on how Inshun likes doing that. Inshun retorts that Mataemon does the same thing. As Mataemon constantly stabs a kunai into his hand, he says that today he doesn't feel like killing girls but wants to kill rats. The two men are being spied on by a ninja. Mataemon suddenly leaps into the trees and slowly kills the ninja. Two more ninjas attack him. He kills one and chases the other. The ninja flees across rooftops, but Mataemon is faster than him. Mataemon calls the ninja a mouse. The ninja calls up other ninjas to assist him. Mataemon tells them his name and how it has been a while since he killed a man. The ninjas believe he is lying about his identity. Mataemon removes the scarf covering the lower half of his face and tells them he is "a born again". The ninja tells him "then you will die again". All the ninjas attack him at once, impaling him on several swords. Mataemon condescends the ninjas' futile attack. He pops the swords out of his body, along with his intestines. He then unsheathes his own sword and uses it along with his dangling intestines to attack and slay the shinobis. Two shinobi escape him. One backs into a dark corner and is quickly sliced to pieces by a resurrected Botaro Tamiya. Botaro tosses a dagger into the other ninja but he replaces himself with a cat. Mataemon yells at Botaro for ruining his fun. At Tajima-no-Kami Yagyu residence, the ninja who survived, whose name is Godaiyu, reports to Munenori Yagyu. He tells him that Lord Yorinobu in Kishu is organizing an army of ronin and that inhuman creatures were appearing. He also tells Munenori that he saw ghosts: Mataemon, Inshun, and Botaro. Munenori doesn't believe him and scolds Godaiyu for drinking. Godaiyu tells Munenori he wasn't drinking. Munenori says that those men were some of the most skilled killers, and he ponders what Shosetsu is planning. He then begins coughing uncontrollably. Godaiyu says that Jubei would be useful. Munenori yells at him to never mention that name, and Godaiyu apologises. Munenori tells him to continue observing Shosetsu, and Godaiyu slides away into the darkness.

Jubei is walking through a fog in the woods when he comes upon a small hut. Inside the hut, Jubei talks to an old man about the prophecy of 'Tenshi'. The old man asks if Jubei really believes in Satan and reminds Jubei that he saw Shiro's staked head. The old man informs Jubei that he has people familiar with underground paths and will be able to use them in case of battle. The old man then tells Jubei that Jubei is too young to quit being a warrior. Jubei tells him he is tired of murdering in the name of duty. The old man asks Jubei how many persons he killed but Jubei tells him that he lost count. The old man says that he should take a break and rest a little. The old man also says that Jubei reminds him of an old friend named Musashi Miyamoto, who strove to excel everyone in swordsmanship and now lives as a hermit in the mountains. As the old man talks to Jubei, a little boy leaves Musashi's house thanking him for the lessons. Musashi's house is dug into the side of a mountain. Inside is very spacious with large gigantic statues of numerous warriors. Musashi recollects the Shimabara revolt and watching Jubei fight. He questions if he would be able to defeat Jubei. Musashi then picks up a paintbrush and begins tirelessly drawing a lot of buddhist pictures. 

Later that night, in Edo, during a full moon; Soiken Mori, Shosetsu Yui, Botaro, Inshun, and Mataemon stand on an altar in a room, surrounding Ocho, who is laying on the floor. They all start chanting "Satan". A cloud blankets the moon, causing the room to darken. Suddenly the moon turns red, the wind blows strongly, and electricity starts flashing within the room. Ocho starts levitating, her body convulsing wildly as her clothes fall off. Suddenly, she exhales an enormous cloud of smog. The smog shapeshifts into a crucifix, then the virgin Mary, and finally into the Devil. After maintaining its Devil form for a few moments, the smog then returns to Ocho's body. A big bulbous growth forms in Ocho's throat and crawls under her skin to her belly, where it turns into faces and then stretches and pulls Ocho's skin chaotically as it wriggles about. Suddenly, many long strands of silver hair fire out of Ocho's body and wrap around wooden beams, bars, the ceiling, and even Soiken's and Shosetsu's necks. Shosetsu tries to get it off, but Soiken tells him to leave it. As Ocho is suspended upside-down, Soiken calls for Satan and Shiro Amakusa to come out. Ten fingers push out of Ocho's mouth and wiggle about. Then a long split cuts from inside Ocho's body and a naked, silver-haired Shiro pushes his way out, ripping her into many pieces. Shiro shrieks and green energy shoots from his body into the air and descends onto the three resurrecteds: Botaro, Mataemon, and Inshun. After charging-up, the four jump through the ceiling. The moon returns to normal.

Somewhere else, Jubei is walking through the woods when suddenly there is a strong gust of wind which cuts his cheek, causing him to bleed. Musashi is still drawing, when a sudden breeze blows out the candle. A drop of blood falls on his page.

There is a street festival going on that night, with hundreds of people in attendance. Botaro is standing in the crowd. He draws his sword and begins slicing randomly, cutting men, women, and children in half. As people start fleeing, Mataemon races through the crowd, hacking people with his sword. Inshun carries a staff with a boomerang blade on the top. He flings the blade into the air and it cuts through many people before returning to his staff. Some persons try fleeing from the spinning blade, but are too slow. Shiro, who can use his hair for attacks, extends his hair to impale and slice-up people. Many  are killed, with their bodies and heads staked for display. Soiken laughs and declares that hell is unleashing its force. The show ends with the four resurrecteds jumping into the air one by one.

Reception
In 1998, ADV Films' decision to release Makai Tensho as Ninja Resurrection caused a wave of confusion among anime fans. First, the animated film ended in a cliffhanger and was never finished after only two episodes were completed. Second and more importantly, most viewers felt they were led to believe that this was a sequel to Ninja Scroll, as both titles featured a main character named Jubei, similar design and animative style and even the title logo was given a design similar to that of the latter. Critics saw this as ADV's attempt to capitalize on the popularity of Ninja Scroll at the time, which had taken American audiences by storm with the exposure assistance from MTV's animated TV series Liquid Television. Ninja Resurrection'''s interesting storyline and character development, violent action horror-gore, and episode cliffhangers left DVD audiences wanting more, that would never come, as no further episodes were released. While Ninja Resurrection'' sold well in the U.S., the deceptive marketing gave it one of the worst reputations in American anime fandom.

External links 
 
 

1997 anime OVAs
ADV Films
Martial arts horror films
Ninja in anime and manga
Samurai in anime and manga
Supernatural anime and manga